Eupithecia aenigma is a moth in the family Geometridae. It is found in south-western China (Yunnan).

The wingspan is about 14 mm. The fore- and hindwings are pale warm brown.

References

Moths described in 2004
aenigma
Moths of Asia